Richard Anderson Caicedo Rodríguez (born December 23, 1992) is an Ecuadorian footballer who plays as a forward for Deportivo Azogues.

Club career
Caicedo played in Portugal for Trofense.

References

External links

1992 births
Living people
Sportspeople from Guayaquil
Association football forwards
Ecuadorian footballers
L.D.U. Loja footballers
C.D. Trofense players
Deportivo Azogues footballers
Ecuadorian expatriate footballers
Expatriate footballers in Portugal